Kilchenzie is a small farming community situated  north of Campbeltown on the Kintyre peninsula in Argyll, Scotland. It is reached from north and south by the A83 road. In 1961 it had a population of 69.

References 

Villages in Kintyre